Lily G. N. Mabura is a Kenyan writer known for her  short story How Shall We Kill the Bishop, which was shortlisted for the Caine Prize in 2010.

Career and education 
Mabura earned a PhD in Engĺish from the University of Missouri, a Master's in Fine Arts degree from the  University of Idaho and a Bachelor of Science from the University of Nairobi. Her 2004 thesis was titled On the Slopes of Mt. Kenya. She is an author and academic, having taught at the  University of Missouri and at the American University of Sharjah.

Honours and awards 
Mabura has received a number of awards including:
Jomo Kenyatta Prize for Literature, Children's Winner 2001 for her book, Ali, the Little Sultan
 Kenya's National Book Week Literary Award for The Pretoria Conspiracy in 2001
 Ellen Meloy Fund for Desert Writers in 2007
 University of Rochester's Frederick Douglass Fellowship in 2008-2009

Selected works

Articles

Books

References 

Year of birth missing (living people)
Living people
20th-century Kenyan women writers
21st-century Kenyan women writers
Kenyan women children's writers
University of Idaho alumni
Academic staff of the American University of Sharjah
University of Missouri alumni
University of Missouri faculty
Women short story writers